The Journal of Business and Psychology is a peer-reviewed academic journal covering research in organizational science. It publishes papers from industrial and organizational psychology, organizational behavior, human resources management, work psychology, occupational psychology, and vocational psychology. It was established in 1986 and is published quarterly by Springer Science+Business Media. The editor-in-chief is Steven G. Rogelberg (University of North Carolina at Charlotte).

Abstracting and indexing 
The journal is abstracted and indexed in:

According to the Web of Science Journal Citation Reports, the journal has a 2012 impact factor of 1.730.

References

External links 
 

Springer Science+Business Media
Quarterly journals
Business and management journals
Organizational psychology journals
English-language journals
Publications established in 1986